Doktor may refer to:

 The word "doctor" in Turkish language, Slavic and Germanic languages
 Doktor nauk, a post-doctoral degree in post-Soviet states
 Doktoringenieur, the German engineering doctorate degree
 Martin Doktor, a sprint canoer
 Paul Doktor, a violinist
 Doktor Yosifovo, a village in Bulgaria
Doktor Yusefpur Fishery, a village in Iran
 Doktor Sleepless, a comic book by Warren Ellis
 Doktor Dolittle, an album by Fred Akerstrom
 "Pan Doktor" and "Stary Doktor", nicknames used for children's author Janusz Korczak

See also 
 Doctor (disambiguation)